Yan Dong Xing (born 20 March 1985) is a Chinese former racing cyclist.

References

External links

1985 births
Living people
Chinese male cyclists